

Camp Topridge is an Adirondack Park Great Camp bought in 1920 and substantially expanded and renovated in 1923 by Marjorie Merriweather Post, founder of General Foods and the daughter of C. W. Post.  The "camp", near Keese Mill, in the U.S. state of New York, was considered by Post to be a "rustic retreat"; it consisted of 68 buildings, including a fully staffed main lodge and private guest cabins, each staffed with its own butler.  It was one of the largest of the Adirondack great camps and possibly the most elaborately furnished.

The estate was designed by local builder Ben Muncil in collaboration with New York architect Theodore Blake.

As originally built, the property could only be reached by water, though a driveway was added in later years. Guests arrived by floatplane or Post's yacht at a private dock, and thence via funicular to the main building at the top of the ridge.  Three times each week, guests would gather in the  living room where full-length movies could be screened; an adjoining dining room seated thirty guests.  Many of the original furnishings of the room, which included an extensive collection of American Indian artifacts, are now in the Smithsonian Institution.  Among the many elaborate structures on the property is a Russian dacha built for Post's third husband, who had served as ambassador to the Soviet Union.

The staff would arrive from Keese Mills Road in Paul Smiths and drive around the water and leave their cars in a parking lot, now used as public parking for the trail to Saint Regis Mountain; the trailhead is near the private property line of Camp Topridge.  From the parking lot, staff would walk a hilly, unpaved path into the workers' side of the camp.  In the early 1970s, this unpaved path was widened and became suitable for one-way car traffic.  Prior to the paving, vehicles could only be driven over the ice in the winter.  

Post's guests would arrive at Saranac Airport (in Lake Clear), often in her private Vickers Viscount, the Merriweather.  They would be driven to a launch which would take them to one of the boat houses.  From there, they could either take the stairs or ride a covered, six-person electronic lift or funicular, installed for Post's aunt Molly Post, who suffered from heart trouble. For years, the caretaker of the camp and his wife would feed lunch to staff in a dining room in the caretaker's home.

Post bequeathed the property to the State of New York. Roger Jakubowski purchased the camp in 1985 for $911,000. It is now owned by Texas real estate magnate Harlan Crow, who has substantially restored the buildings and added several new ones. The property was listed on the National Register of Historic Places in 1986.

Gallery

Notes

References
 Kaiser, Harvey H., Great camps of the Adirondacks.  Boston: David R. Godine, 1982.  .

External links

 New York Times, "Out-Twigging the Neighbors; In the Adirondacks, Great Camps Are Sprouting Again." Includes news of recent renovations.

Adirondack Great Camps
Geography of New York (state)
Residential buildings on the National Register of Historic Places in New York (state)
Buildings and structures in Franklin County, New York
National Register of Historic Places in Franklin County, New York